Anolis tenorioensis is a species of lizard in the family Dactyloidae. The species is found in Costa Rica.

References

Anoles
Reptiles described in 2011
Endemic fauna of Costa Rica
Reptiles of Costa Rica
Taxa named by Gunther Köhler